Sandrine Mathivet (born 25 October 1968) is a French football manager for FCF Juvisy.

References

1968 births
Women's association football managers
Female association football managers
Living people